BCCA may refer to:

 BC Cancer Agency
 Badruka College of Commerce and Arts
 Bergen County Christian Academy
 Birth Control Council of America
 Brewery Collectibles Club of America
 British Columbia Court of Appeal

See also
 British Cycling; previously the British Cyclo-Cross Association